This is a list of countries by average annual precipitation.

List

See also
 List of countries by average yearly temperature

Notes

References

precipitation
Climate and weather statistics
precipitation